Ricci Crisostomo (born November 29, 1975) is a Filipino television and film actor who hails from Marikina, Manila and his real name is Richard C Crisostomo.

Crisostomo has worked in the television industry for more than 10 years, both  and making appearances in front of the camera, including his eye was featured in the show Darna and Majika, and he has made appearances on shows such as  Boys Nxt Door, SRO Cinemaserye and more.

Biography

Early life
Born Richard C Crisostomo to  Milagros Cleofas Crisostomo and Rosauro Crisostomo, he was a first-born child.  A few years later his little sister Maria Romina Crisostomo was born, followed by his little brother John Rosauro Crisostomo.

Crisostomo attended school in Parang, Marikina and later attended college at Roosevelt College.

References

Richard Crisostomo on IMDB - Richard Crisostomo IMDB Page

External links
 Ricci's Blog
 GMA Television Network

Living people
1975 births
People from Marikina
Male actors from Metro Manila